The following is a list of Trans-Siberian Orchestra touring members, past and present. This list does not contain guest members.

Winter 2018

Winter 2017

Winter 2016

Winter 2015

Wacken 2015

Winter 2014

Europe 2014
Chris Caffery - Guitar
Al Pitrelli - Guitar, music director
Johnny Lee Middleton - Bass
Jeff Plate - Drums
Asha Mevlana - Violin
Vitalij Kuprij - Keyboards
Mee Eun Kim - Keyboards
Bryan Hicks - Narrator
Jeff Scott Soto - Vocals
Chloe Lowery - Vocals
Kayla Reeves - Vocals
Autumn Guzzardi - Vocals
Natalya Piette - Vocals
Rob Evan - Vocals
Nathan James - Vocals
Robin Borneman - Vocals
Erika Jerry - Vocals
Andrew Ross - Vocals, Guitar
Paul O'Neill - Guitar (selected shows only)

Winter 2013

Winter 2012

Spring 2012 - Beethoven's Last Night
Chris Caffery - Guitar
Al Pitrelli - Guitar
Johnny Lee Middleton - Bass
Jeff Plate - Drums
Roddy Chong - Violin
Vitalij Kuprij - Keyboards
Mee Eun Kim - Keyboards
Bryan Hicks - Narrator
Rob Evan - Vocals (Beethoven)
Andrew Ross - Vocals (Twist)
Ronny Munroe - Vocals (Mephistoteles)
Chris Pinnella - Vocals (young Beethoven)
Chloe Lowery - Vocals (Theresa)
Georgia Napolitano - Vocals (Fate)
Natalya Rose - Vocals
April Berry - Vocals
Kayla Reeves - Vocals

Winter 2011

Europe 2011
Chris Caffery - Guitar
Al Pitrelli - Guitar
Johnny Lee Middleton - Bass
Jeff Plate - Drums
Roddy Chong - Violin
Vitalij Kuprij - Keyboards
Mee Eun Kim - Keyboards
Bryan Hicks - Narrator
Rob Evan - Vocals
Andrew Ross - Vocals
Jeff Scott Soto - Vocals
Georgia Napolitano - Vocals
Kayla Reeves - Vocals
Chloe Lowery - Vocals
Paul O'Neill - Guitar (selected shows only)

Winter 2010

Winter 2009

Winter 2008

References

Lists of musicians